is both a combat sport and a stand-up fighting promotion company based in Tokyo, Japan. The organization was founded by former kickboxer Caesar Takeshi in 1985.

Shootboxing is a mixture of its two parent combat styles of shoot wrestling and kickboxing, allowing for kicks, punches, knees, elbows, throws, and standing submissions (chokeholds, armlocks and wristlocks).

History 
Shoot boxing (commonly written as Shootboxing) was created in August 1985 by former kickboxer Caesar Takeshi.
 The first Shootboxing event took place on September 1, 1985.

Some mixed martial artists such as Hayato Sakurai began their careers in Shootboxing. Shootboxing has also drawn fighters who became famous in other promotions such as Jens Pulver. Many K-1 World MAX stars also either debuted in Shootboxing or have fought for Shootboxing in the past, including Andy Souwer, Albert Kraus, and Buakaw Banchamek.

Rules
Shootboxing rules are as follows:

Match form
Professional shoot boxing matches fall into one of two classes, Expert class and Freshman class. The length of an Expert class match is five rounds of three minutes each, followed by one or two extra rounds of three minutes each in the event of a tie. The interval between rounds is one minute.

The length of a Freshman class match is three rounds of three minutes each, followed by one or two three-minute rounds in the event of a tie. The interval between rounds is also one minute.

Weight classes
Professional shoot boxers are divided into weight classes as follows:

Sparrowweight was divided into Flyweight and Super flyweight, and Eagleweight was divided into Heavyweight and Super heavyweight since 2001.

Match judgment
One way to win a shoot boxing match is to knock one's opponent out.  A fighter can be knocked out in different ways.  If, after being knocked down, a fighter fails to stand up after a count of ten, or if, after standing up, he fails to assume a fighting stance after a count of eight, he is knocked out.  The same occurs if a fighter is knocked out of the ring and fails to return before a count of twenty.  A referee may also rule a fighter knocked out if the fighter shows no fighting spirit, appears unable to defend his or her self, or makes a gesture of submission.

Technical knockouts can also occur in shoot boxing, in cases where the fighter is injured, the referee rules the fighter knocked out after two knockdowns in the same round, or the fighter's corner throws in the towel.  A fight may also be stopped if a doctor rules that continuation would be dangerous to a fighter.

If neither a knockout nor a technical knockout occurs, the winner is determined by a decision.  Fighters are graded on their effectiveness on attack and defense, their success in achieving and escaping submissions, and how close they have come to ending the match.  Decisions generally produce a winner, but can result in a draw.

A judgement of "no contest" may also be returned, if the judges suspect foul play or conclude that the fighters are not fighting sincerely.

Match scoring
Fighters are awarded points for their success in striking, throwing, and applying standing submission holds to their opponent.  They are also given points for four categories of performance: number of times down, amount of damage done to opponent, number of clean hits, and aggressiveness.  Fighters are graded from 1-10 in each category, with the difference of score in any one category being limited to 4 points.

Extra points can be awarded at certain points in the match, when the referee makes certain calls.  When a fighter performs a front or back throwing technique, the referee calls "shoot", denoting one of these opportunities.  The other occurs when a fighter achieves a standing submission; at this point, the referee calls "catch".

Fouls
Foul play is recognized as the following ① to ⑬.  After a warning, the fighter will receive a point deduction for further infractions.  If the same fighter commits another foul, another point is deducted, and a final warning is given. If a third warning is given to the same fighter, he is disqualified and loses the fight.
If the referee feels that it was not a flagrant foul, he may allow the fight to continue.
1:Headbutting the opponent.
2:Striking the opponent in the groin.
3:Biting the opponent.
4:Attacking the opponent while he is falling, or when he is getting up.
5:Attacking an opponent after the referee signals for a break.
6:Utilizing the ropes to aid one's offense or defense.
7:To insult or use offensive speech and actions towards an opponent or the referee.
8:Striking the opponent in the back of the head.
9:The act of intentionally grounding a glove or knee to the mat to defend an attack.
10:Intentionally causing the opponent to fall out of the ring.
11:Intentionally leaving the ring.
12:It makes everything of the act of not being admitted by the other rule foul play.
a) If a fighter ever accuses the judges of not being impartial, points are to be immediately deducted.
b) The act of ducking the head low and diving into the opponent in such a manner that appears similar to a headbutt.
When either fighter receives a cut from a headbutt, the fighter that made the cut receives a point deduction, even if the headbutt was accidental.
If the referee decides that the headbutt was intentional, the fighter receives a two-point deduction.
c) Repeated holding which does not appear to be an attack, nor an attempt to escape attacks, will be subject to point deductions after warnings from the referee.
"An attempt to escape attacks" is defined as the act whose intent is to interrupt the opponent's offense or defense by grappling immediately after an attack.

A fighter will be disqualified in the case of any of the following situations:
1:When there is intentional foul play, and the referee declares a disqualification for the action.
2:When the fighter does not obey the referee.
3:If a fighter cannot continue when the round begins.
4:When a fighter's attitude is overly rough or violent, with the intent to cause bodily harm above and beyond what is considered to be necessary to compete.
5:When the referee decides a fighter lacks fighting spirit, or the desire to continue.
6:When a fighter receives three point deductions in one round.
7:When a doctor declares a fighter unfit to continue the match.
8:When violating fight regulations.

Championship history

S-Cup World Champions

Male S-Cup World Champions
S-Cup, the Shoot Boxing World Cup, is the 8 man single elimination World Tournament generally held once every 2 years since 1995.

Girls S-Cup World Champions
Girls S-Cup, is the 8 woman single elimination World Tournament generally held once every year since 2009.

Shoot Boxing Japan champions

Men Shoot Boxing Japan champions

Heavyweight championship (formerly Super Eagleweight)
Weight limit: 90kg

Light Heavyweight championship (formerly Eagleweight)
Weight limit: 80kg

Super Middleweight championship (formerly Hawkweight)
Weight limit: 75kg

Middleweight championship (formerly Junior Hawkweight)
Weight limit: 72.5kg

Super Welterweight championship (formerly Falconweight)
Weight limit: 70kg

Welterweight championship (formerly Junior Falconweight)
Weight limit: 67.5kg

Super Lightweight championship (formerly Seagullweight)
Weight limit: 65kg

Lightweight championship (formerly Junior Seagullweight)
Weight limit: 62.5kg

Super Featherweight championship (formerly Cardinalweight)
Weight limit: 60kg

Featherweight championship (formerly Junior Cardinalweight)
Weight limit: 57.5kg

Super Bantamweight championship (formerly Owlweight)
Weight limit: 55kg

Bantamweight championship (formerly Junior Owlweight)
Weight limit: 52.5kg

Women Shoot Boxing Japan champions

Girls Japan S-cup

Women's Lightweight championship
Weight limit: 65kg

Women's Flyweight championship (formerly Ladybugweight)
Weight limit: 52kg

Women's Strawweight championship
Weight limit: 49kg

Women's Atomweight championship
Weight limit: 46kg

Shoot Boxing International champions

Shoot Boxing International Men champions

World Heavyweight championship 
Weight limit: 90kg

World Middleweight championship 
Weight limit: 75kg

World Super Welterweight championship 
Weight limit: 70kg

Australia Super Welterweight championship 
Weight limit: 70kg

Brazil Super Welterweight championship 
Weight limit: 70kg

America Super Welterweight championship 
Weight limit: 70kg

World Welterweight championship 
Weight limit: 67.5kg

Oriental and Pacific Super Welterweight championship 
Weight limit: 67.5kg

World Super Lightweight championship 
Weight limit: 65kg

America Super Featherweight championship 
Weight limit: 60kg

Shoot Boxing International Women champions

Asia Tournament

World Women's Flyweight championship
Weight limit: 52kg

See also 
List of male kickboxers
List of female kickboxers
Sanda (sport)
Shootfighting
Shootwrestling

References 

 Shoot boxing official rules

External links
 Official website of shoot boxing(Japanese)

Official website of Hong Kong Shoot Boxing Association

 
Individual sports
Combat sports
Kickboxing organizations
Hybrid martial arts
Japanese martial arts
Sports originating in Japan
1985 establishments in Japan